Isatay Taymanuly (İsatay Taymanūly; ; 1791 – July 12, 1838) was a Kazakh hero (батыр "batır") and leader (with his friend Makhambet Utemisuly) of a rebellion against Zhangir-Kerey Khan of Bukey Horde and the Russian rulers of Kazakhstan in the 19th century.

The rebellion began in late 1836 and the beginning of 1837.

İsatay was killed in fighting near the Aqbulaq River on July 12, 1838.  According to Baymirza Hayit's book "Turkistan: Between Russia and China" after his army was defeated, İsatay Batır got into a sword fight against seven Russian Cossack soldiers; eventually he got overwhelmed and was killed by decapitation.

External links 
 Biography of Taimanov
 Great Soviet Encyclopedia about Isatay
 Tarlan about Isatay

19th-century Kazakhstani people
1791 births
1838 deaths
Military personnel killed in action
Kazakhstani military personnel
Ethnic Kazakh people